The following is a partial list of notable musicians and musical groups, past and present, from Oregon of the United States. The list is grouped by metropolitan areas.

Portland Metro Area

16volt
31Knots
36 Crazyfists
Jedediah Aaker
Ævangelist
Carrie B. Wilson Adams
Derroll Adams
Obo Addy
Edward Aldwell
Art Alexakis
Susan Alexjander
Agalloch
Ages and Ages
Agalloch
Alan Singley and Pants Machine
Al-Andalus Ensemble
Alex Krebs Tango Quartet
Alialujah Choir
All Girl Summer Fun Band
Dave Allen
American Me
Aminé
Signe Toly Anderson
Alex Arrowsmith
American Music Program
Anatomy of a Ghost
Kristin Andreassen
Anne
Geno Arce
Archers Rise
Ash Black Buffalo
Gil Assayas
Audio Learning Center
Austere
Jacob Avshalomov
Yung Bae
Tarik & Julia Banzi
Bark Hide and Horn
R. Barrows
Battleme
Emilie Frances Bauer
Bill Beach
Jim Beatty
Beautiful Eulogy
Becca
Jona Bechtolt
Billy D and the Hoodoos
Diane Birch
Kat Bjelland
Black 'N Blue
Black Prairie
Blanket Music
Blind Pilot
Blitzen Trapper
Weyes Blood
Theodore Bloomfield
Blouse
Blue Giant
Rachel Blumberg
Henry Bogdan
Braille
Michael Braun
Broadway Calls
Isaac Brock
Heather Woods Broderick
Peter Broderick
Jacinta Brondgeest
Brothers of the Baladi
Brooks Brown
Mel Brown
Tiffany Lee Brown
Carrie Brownstein
Corey Brunish
George Bruns
Bruxa
Peter Buck
Bugskull
The Builders and the Butchers
Kenji Bunch
John Bunzow
Kevin Burke
Ken Butler
Geoff Byrd
Mike Byrne
Cadallaca
Calamity Jane
John Callahan
Ernie Carson
Maria Catherine Callahan
Cappella Romana
Captain Bogg and Salty
Barry Carl
Cars & Trains
James Cassidy
Craig Carothers
Cletis Carr
Dave Carter and Tracy Grammer
Case/lang/veirs
Castle Jazz Band
Caveman Shoestore
Chervona
Fred Child
Mose Christensen
Keith Christopher
Chromatics
Clamtones
Jillian Clare
Mike Clark
Kneel Cohn
Fred Cole
Jenny Conlee
Cool Nutz
Sam Coomes
Copy

Mike Coykendall
The Crabs
Kyle Craft
Larry Crane
Dan Cunneen
Dan Reed Network
Danava
The Dandy Warhols
Dat'r
Valerie Day
Dead Moon
The Dead Stars on Hollywood
Deen Castronovo
Dear Nora
Brent DeBoer
The Decemberists
Defiance
The Delines
Leon del Muerte
Paul deLay
Dharma Bums
Alela Diane
Jonny Diaz
The Dimes
Beth Ditto
DJ Anjali and the Incredible Kid
Dogheart
Dolorean
Don and the Goodtimes
Lee Dorsey
The Doubleclicks
Sarah Dougher
Dr. Theopolis
Matt Drenik
Drowse
Dualesc
Dweller at the Threshold
East Forest
Eastern Sunz
Echo Helstrom
Ecid
Nicholas Edwards
Eight Bells

Jack Ely
Emancipator
Mark Englert
Epoxies
Donna Esposito
Essiet Essiet
Claire L. Evans
Ever We Fall
Everclear
The Exploding Hearts 
Brendan Faegre
Fallstar
Amparito Farrar
Lucia Fasano
Fedayeen
Federale
Tom Filepp
Filthy Friends
Final Warning
Shae Fiol
Eddie Fisher
Five Fingers of Funk
Floater
Mary Flower
Foghorn Stringband
Richmond Fontaine
Fort Atlantic
Kathy Foster
Alma Francis
Dave Frishberg
Chris Funk
Tony Furtado
Tim Gaines
Jon Garcia
Josh Garrels
Lenny Gault
Lorraine Geller
The Gentry
Jacques Gershkovitch
Laura Gibson
Glass Candy
Golden Delicious
Golden Retriever
Gossip
John Gourley
Grails
Grand Duchy
Tom Grant
Jessie Coles Grayson
Steve Green
Grouper
Janice Grube
Gary Guthman
Rich Halley
Page Hamilton
Olivebelle Hamon
Kathleen Hanna
Hutch Harris
Lou Harrison
Michael Allen Harrison
Adam Hawley
Frank Hayes
Phil Haynes
Hazel
Tommy Heath
Heatmiser
Collin Hegna
Dana Heitman
The Helio Sequence
Kent Henry
Sam Henry
Haley Heynderickx
The High Violets
Hillsboro Symphony Orchestra
Hillstomp
Hockey
Claire Hodgkins
Peter Holmström
The Holy Modal Rounders
Holy Sons
Honey Bucket
Honkytonk Homeslice
Patterson Hood
Willem van Hoogstraten
A Hope for Home
Horse Feathers
The Hudson Brothers
Bill Hudson
Brett Hudson
Mark Hudson
The Hugs
The Hunches
Hunger
Ron Hurst
I Can Lick Any Sonofabitch in the House
Iame
Icarus the Owl
Illmaculate
Inked in Blood
Insomniac Folklore
Issa
It Prevails
The Jackals
Jackie-O Motherfucker
Melynda Jackson
Sara Jackson-Holman
Gary Jarman
Jen and Kat
Jessy J
The Joggers
Johnny Jewel
Jolly Mon
Alan Jones
Rena Jones
JonnyX and the Groadies
Joseph
Juke Joint Gamblers
Kaddisfly
Eric John Kaiser
Carlos Kalmar
Louis Kaufman
Pat Kearns
Key of Dreams
Eddie Kilfeather
Rebecca Kilgore
Kind of Like Spitting
King Bee
King Black Acid
Nancy King
The Kingsmen
Travis Knight
Josef Komarek
Pete Krebs
Kutless
L'Acéphale
Patrick Lachman
Lackthereof
K.d. lang
Storm Large
The Last Artful, Dodgr
Thomas Lauderdale
Scott Law
Laz-D
Douglas Leedy
Rod Levitt
Norman Leyden
Lifesavas
Jon Lindsay
Mark Lindsay
Jon Lindstrom
The Lives of Famous Men
Loch Lomond
Jeff Lorber
Halie Loren
Lost Lander
Courtney Love
Love on Ice
Sergiu Luca
Sara Lund
Logan Lynn
M. Ward
Mackintosh Braun

Stephen Malkmus
Mandarin Dynasty
Kate Mann
Lisa Mann
Robert Mann
Leigh Marble
MarchFourth Marching Band
Tucker Martine
Josh Martinez
Ana Matronic
Paul Mazzio
Scott McCaughey
John McEntire
Bibi McGill
Michael McQuilken
MDC
Mean Jeans
Colin Meloy
 Tahirah Memory
Thara Memory
Daniel Menche
Menomena
James Mercer
Metropolitan Youth Symphony
Middian

Mimicking Birds
Mirah
The Minders
The Miracle Workers
Grace Mitchell
Pete Miser
Glen Moore
Phil Moore
Modest Mouse
Mordecai
Neal Morgan
Morning Teleportation
Joan Morris
Lee Morse
Dent Mowrey
Bua Xou Mua
Musée Mécanique
Naked Violence
Napalm Beach
Casey Neill
Neo Boys
The Neverclaim
New Bad Things
Chris Newman
Kaitlyn ni Donovan
Scout Niblett
Ruban Nielson
The No-No's
No. 2
Norfolk & Western
Nu Shooz
Nudge
Cheryl Moana Marie Nunes
Nurses
The Obituaries
Oh Darling
Patrick O'Hearn
Ohmega Watts
Old Time Relijun
George Olsen
William Olvis
The Operacycle
Oregon Chorale
Oregon Crusaders organization
Oregon Mandolin Orchestra
Oregon Repertory Singers
Oregon Symphony
Mark Orton
Billy Oskay
The Out Crowd
Savannah Outen
Tommy Overstreet
Pagan Babies
Parenthetical Girls
Thomas H. Parrott
Ralph Patt
Moultrie Patten
James Paul
Katherine Paul
Paul Revere & the Raiders
Beverly Peck Johnson
Pell Mell
Jim Pepper
Perola
Pete International Airport
Pillorian
Pink Martini
Pleasure
Joe Plummer
Poison Idea
Pond
Portland Baroque Orchestra
The Portland Cello Project
Portland Chamber Orchestra
Portland Choir & Orchestra
Portland Columbia Symphony
Portland Gay Men's Chorus
Portland Lesbian Choir
Portland Taiko
Portland Youth Philharmonic
Jane Powell
Joe Powers
The Prids
Priory
Providence
Pulseprogramming
The Punk Group
Pure Bathing Culture
Chris Pureka
Quarterflash
Quasi
Harry Rabinowitz
Alicia Jo Rabins
RAC
Ruth Radelet
Radiation City
Ramona Falls
Billy Rancher
The Range Rats
The Rats
Johnnie Ray
Red Fang
Michael Redman
Kirk Reeves
Andrea Reinkemeyer
Corrina Repp
Rescue
Rhys
Amanda Richards
Fritz Richmond
The Riffs
Rita Sabler Quartet
Lolita Ritmanis
Terry Robb
Miles Benjamin Anthony Robinson
Alyce Rogers
Raina Rose
Greg Sage
Curtis Salgado
Sallie Ford and the Sound Outside
James Sample
Jesse Sandoval
Sassparilla
Alexandra Savior
Dan Schmid
Isaac Scott
Janice Scroggins
Sexton Blake
The Shaky Hands
She & Him
The Shins
The Shivers
Shook Twins
Shy Girls
Enric Sifa
Jacques Singer
Lori Singer
Sixteen Cities
The Slants
Sleater-Kinney
Sleep
Langhorne Slim
Smegma
Elliott Smith
Lawrence Leighton Smith
Norm Smith
Todd Snider
Sons of Day
Sophe Lux
Beau Sorenson
Ferdinand Sorenson
Soriah
Southerly
Esperanza Spalding
The Spinanes
Spoon
Jaime St. James
The Standard
Starfucker
Starover Blue
Stars of Track and Field
Tyler Stenson
Stephen Malkmus and the Jicks
James Stevens
Still Pending
The Stolen Sweets
Stovokor
John Stowell
Strange Ranger
Strength
Strfkr
Summer Cannibals
Swan Island
Swan Sovereign
Sweaty Nipples
Swords, also known as The Swords Project
Taarka
Talkdemonic
David Tamkin
Courtney Taylor-Taylor
Hollis Taylor
Tea for Julie
Team Dresch
Tears Run Rings
Vernon Tejas
Tender Forever
Thanksgiving
Tommy Thayer
Theatre of Sheep 
The Thermals
The Third Sex
Ural Thomas
Thundering Asteroids!
Anna Tivel
Toxic Holocaust
Tracker
Tragedy
Trevino Brings Plenty
John Trudeau
Typhoon
The U-Krew
Unipiper
The United Travel Service
Unknown Mortal Orchestra
The Upsidedown
Veio
Laura Veirs
Vektroid
Velvet Cacoon
Verah Falls
Liz Vice
The Village Green
Leroy Vinnegar
Visible Cloaks
Viva Voce
Wake Owl
Christopher Walla
Holcombe Waller
Wampire

Liv Warfield
Warlord
Johanna Warren
The Water Tower Bucket Boys
A Weather
Weinland
Janet Weiss
Western Front
Wet Confetti
Nancy Whang
Whip
Josh White
Evan Wickham
Wild Dogs
Wild Flag
Wild Ones
Brad Wilk
Gabriel Wilson
Kaia Wilson
Winter of Apokalypse
Wipers
Witch Mountain
Ben Wolfe
Renn Woods
Wow & Flutter
Rob Wrong
Juliet Wyers
Maiah Wynne
Y La Bamba
Yacht
Yeat
Yellow Swans
Yum Yum Children
Yume Bitsu
Quiz Zilla

Eugene Metro Area

Adickdid
Aerodrone
Akem Manah
Alive Like Me
Black Francis
Tracy Bonham
Brooks Brown
Tiffany Lee Brown
Cadet
Andie Case
Nalini Cheriel
Cherry Poppin' Daddies
Cigar
Cletis Carr
Ian Crawford
Robert Cray
Debaser
Sarah Dougher
Peter Epstein
Eugene Concert Choir
Eugene Symphony
Eugene-Springfield Youth Orchestras
Floater, moved to Portland in 1997
Anna Gilbert
Green Garter Band
Tony Glausi
Tim Hardin
Bill Harkleroad
Megan Marie Hart
Evynne Hollens
Peter Hollens
Tom Intondi
Japanese Breakfast
Andrew Katz, of Car Seat Headrest
Kelly Keagy
Mat Kearney
Justin King
Emily Kokal
Mark Lindsay
Halie Loren
Thomas Mapfumo
Susan Marshall
Shawn McDonald
Rose McGowan
Justin Meldal-Johnsen
Oregon
Oregon Mozart Players
Steve Perry
Susan Raye
Helmuth Rilling
RJD2
Miles Benjamin Anthony Robinson
Rock 'n' Roll Soldiers

Rootdown
Marty Ross
Elizabeth Rowe
Dan Schmid
Dan Siegel
Some Velvet Sidewalk
Christopher Stevens
Stick Against Stone
Surf Trio
This Patch of Sky
Matt Treder
Corin Tucker
Milagro Vargas
Charlie Vázquez
Henry Vestine
The Visible Men
Aja Volkman
Von Pimpenstein
Theresa Wayman
Ben Weaver
White Hot Odyssey
Mason Williams
Taylor John Williams
Carsten Woll
Paul Wright
Yob
Michelle Zauner

Salem Metro Area

Kat Bjelland
Winifred Byrd
John Doan
John Fahey
Hell
Hallie Parrish Hinges
Kelly LeMieux
Cory Kendrix
Audrey Luna
John Moen
Kate Nauta
Kathy Boyd and Phoenix Rising
 Ryan Neighbors, of Portugal. The Man
Larry Norman
Jim Pepper
 Joe Preston, of The Melvins, High on Fire, and Thrones
Saint
The Severin Sisters
 Typhoon
Dolora Zajick

Corvallis Metro Area

Archers Rise
Debra Arlyn
Bill Beach
Chris Botti
Meredith Brooks
Collin Raye
Crazy 8s
Eyvind Kang
Wayne Krantz
David Metzger
Stephen Scott
Brian Smith
Mandana Coleman Thorp
The W's
The Wrays

Medford Metro Area

Alice DiMicele
Johnny Gruelle
Gary "Chicken" Hirsh
Peter Hollens
Scott Kelly
Forrest Kline
Rose Maddox
Neighb'rhood Childr'n
Michael Ruppert
Jon Micah Sumrall
Larry Wagner
Virus Nine

Other
Hoyt Axton, from Glide
Shannon Bex, from Bend
Ernest Bloch, from Newport
Broadway Calls, from Rainier
Hanneke Cassel, from Oregon
Cindertalk, from Oregon
Columbia Gorge Orchestra Association, from Hood River
The Dirtball, from Prineville
A Dream Too Late, from Albany
Falling Up, from Albany
Flor, from Hood River
Rick Foster, Days Creek
Michael Garrison, from Roseburg
Joseph Gramley, from Oregon
David Haney, from McMinnville
Tyler Hentschel, from Roseburg
Tim Johnson, from Noti
Jerry Kilgore, from Tillamook
Larry and His Flask, from Bend
Charles Littleleaf, from Warm Springs Indian Reservation
Matt the Electrician, from southern Oregon
Victor Aloysius Meyers, from Seaside
Harold Vincent Milligan, from Astoria
Mr. Lucky and the Gamblers, from Newport
David Nevue, from North Bend
Mickey Newbury, from Vida
Vincent C. Plunkett, from Oregon
Oregon Jazz Band, from Coos Bay
Oregon East Symphony, from Pendelton
Johnnie Ray, from Hopewell
The Send, from Albany
Doc Severinsen, from Arlington
Jamie Slocum, from Grants Pass
Lewis Southworth, from Waldport
Ryan Steveneson, from Bonanza
The Toyes, from Grants Pass
Marcia Van Dyke, from Grants Pass
Doc Watkins, from Oregon
Griff Williams, from La Grande
Bridgette Wilson, from Gold Beach
Johnny Zell, from Oregon

References

 
Oregon
Oregon culture
Lists of people from Oregon
Lists of American musicians